1,3-Benzodioxolylbutanamine (also known as 3,4-methylenedioxybutanphenamine, MDB, BDB, J, and 3,4-methylenedioxy-α-ethylphenethylamine) is an entactogenic drug of the phenethylamine chemical class. It is the α-ethyl analog of MDPEA and MDA and the methylenedioxy analogue of α-ethylphenethylamine.

BDB was first synthesized by Alexander Shulgin. In his book PiHKAL, the dosage range is listed as 150–230 mg and the duration is listed as 4–8 hours. BDB produces entactogenic, MDMA-like effects. Although pleasant and euphoric, BDB is also fairly sedating and some users feel that the lack of stimulant effect makes it less enjoyable than other similar drugs. Additional side effects associated with BDB include nystagmus and dizziness. Very little data exists about the pharmacological properties, metabolism, and toxicity of BDB.

Animal studies and anecdotal reports show that BDB is a slightly more potent serotonin releasing agent than its methylated sister compound methylbenzodioxylbutanamine (MBDB; "Eden", "Methyl-J"). However, it is more commonly known as a metabolite of the N-alkylated analogues MBDB and ethylbenzodioxylbutanamine (EBDB; "Ethyl-J") which have appeared in methylenedioxymethamphetamine (MDMA; "Ecstasy", "Adam", "Empathy", "Molly", "E", "X", "XTC") tablets. Although BDB itself has not been reported as being sold as "Ecstasy", urine analysis of "Ecstasy" users suggest that this drug may have appeared as a street drug, although it is unclear whether the positive urine test for BDB resulted from consumption of BDB itself or merely as a metabolite of MBDB.

Legal status
1,3-Benzodioxolylbutanamine is illegal in Germany (Anlage I)

See also 
 1-(4-Methylphenyl)-2-aminobutane

References 

Psychedelic phenethylamines
Benzodioxoles
Serotonin-norepinephrine-dopamine releasing agents
Entactogens and empathogens